This is a list of anime series by franchise series total episode count for series with a minimum of 200 total episodes in the franchise, including television series episodes and specials, OVAs, and films. The series in the list combine all episodes in a franchise series within the original work or original text regardless of series subtitle. For example, even though each individual Sailor Moon series has a different title, they are all combined into one total for this list.

Series

The series are listed with the highest count at the top.

See also
 :Category:Lists of anime episodes
 List of manga series by volume count
 List of television programs by episode count

References

Citations

Footnotes 

episode count
Entertainment-related lists of superlatives
Lists of media series